The South Korean boy band Seventeen embarked on their first concert tour entitled Seventeen 1st Asia Tour 2016 Shining Diamonds in July through September 2016, performing at venues in nations including Singapore, Australia, New Zealand and China. The string of concerts began in South Korea where 13,000 tickets were sold. They have also held four showcases.

Seventeen 1st Asia Tour 2016 Shining Diamond

Seventeen 1st Asia Tour 2016 Shining Diamond was Seventeen's first tour of Asia organised by Pledis Entertainment and Type Communication Group. The tour was held from August 13 to September 11, 2016, in Singapore, Manila, Jakarta, Bangkok, Melbourne, Sydney, Auckland, Kowloon, Beijing and Taipei.

Set list

2017 Seventeen 1st World Tour "Diamond Edge" 

2017 Seventeen 1st World Tour "Diamond Edge" was Seventeen's first world tour organized by Pledis Entertainment, Show Note and Live Nation. The tour was held from July 14 to October 6, 2017, in Seoul, Saitama, Bangkok, Hong Kong, Chicago, Dallas, Toronto, Santiago, New York, Kuala Lumpur, Jakarta, Singapore, Taipei and Manila, visiting total 14 cities. They met with over 200,000 fans all over the world.

Seventeen 2018 Japan Arena Tour 'SVT' 

Seventeen 2018 Japan Arena Tour 'SVT' is Seventeen's Japan concert tour prior to Japanese debut organized by Pledis Entertainment. The tour was held from February 21 to March 7, 2018, in Yokohama, Osaka and Nagoya, visiting a total of 3 cities.

Seventeen Concert 'Ideal Cut' 2018

Seventeen 2019 Japan Tour 'Haru' 

Seventeen 2019 Japan Tour 'Haru' is Seventeen's 3rd Japan concert tour organized by Pledis Entertainment & Pledis Japan. The tour will be run from April 2 to 27, 2019, in Fukuoka, Shizuoka, Saitama, Chiba and Osaka, visiting a total of 5 cities.

Seventeen World Tour 'Ode to You'

Seventeen 2020 Japan Dome Tour

Seventeen World Tour 'Be The Sun

Concerts

Like Seventeen – Boys Wish

Like Seventeen – Boys Wish Encore Concert

Like Seventeen "Shining Diamond" Concert

17 Japan Concert: Say The Name #Seventeen

Fan meetings

Korean fan meetings

Japanese fan meetings

Showcases

Joint tours and concerts

References

External links
 

Lists of concert tours
Lists of concert tours of South Korean artists
Lists of events in South Korea
South Korean music-related lists
K-pop concerts by artist
Concerts